The Big Muddy National Fish and Wildlife Refuge was established in 1994, and has grown to over . Like pearls on a string, these acres are spread out as individual units along the Missouri River between Kansas City and St. Louis. These pearls of habitat benefit floodplain-dependent fish and wildlife species.

The pre-development Missouri River as documented by Lewis and Clark was considerably different from today's river. The historic Missouri was a broad, slow-moving, shallow river with braided channels. These past river conditions created a haven for wildlife, which included vast floodplain forests of giant trees, marshes, and even wet prairies. Today's river is channelized. It is deeper and faster, and controlled by levees, dikes, and other containment structures. These controls make the river more navigable and the surrounding floodplain ideal for agriculture.

The Big Muddy Refuge is allowing the Missouri River to be a river again, to enter its floodplain. This occurs during minor flood events. Management has created side channels, cut down levees, and allowed the floodplain vegetation to return. Currently, in many places the refuge is an impenetrable thicket of young trees and vegetation, but, as the trees grow and the refuge matures, its appearance will change. The process may take decades or even centuries.

References
Refuge website

Protected areas of Callaway County, Missouri
Protected areas of Cooper County, Missouri
Protected areas of Howard County, Missouri
Protected areas of Lafayette County, Missouri
Missouri River
Wetlands of Missouri
National Wildlife Refuges in Missouri
Protected areas established in 1994
Protected areas of Ray County, Missouri
Protected areas of St. Louis County, Missouri
Protected areas of Saline County, Missouri
Floodplains of the United States
Landforms of Callaway County, Missouri
Landforms of Cooper County, Missouri
Landforms of Howard County, Missouri
Landforms of Lafayette County, Missouri
Landforms of Ray County, Missouri
Landforms of St. Louis County, Missouri
Landforms of Saline County, Missouri
1994 establishments in Missouri